The play-offs of the 2009 Fed Cup Asia/Oceania Zone Group I were the final stages of the Group I zonal competition involving teams from Asia and Oceania. Using the positions determined in their pools, the eight teams faced off to determine their placing in the 2009 Fed Cup Asia/Oceania Zone Group I. The top team advanced to the World Group II, and the bottom team were relegated down to the Group II for the next year.

Promotional play-offs 
The first placed teams of each pool were placed against each other in a head-to-head round. The winner of the rounds advanced to the World Group II Play-offs, where they would get a chance to advance to the World Group II for next year.

New Zealand vs. Australia

Third to fourth play-offs 
The second-placed teams from each pool were drawn in head-to-head rounds to find the third and fourth placed teams.

Indonesia vs. Thailand

Fifth to sixth play-off 
The third placed teams of each pool were placed against each other in a ties. The winner of the tie was allocated fifth place in the Group while the loser was allocated sixth.

Uzbekistan vs. South Korea

Relegation play-offs 
The last placed teams of each pool were placed against each other in a head-to-head round. The losing team was relegated to Group II for next year.

India vs. Chinese Taipei

Final placements 

  advanced to the World Group II Play-offs, and were drawn against . They won 3–2, and thus advanced to World Group II.
  was relegated down to Asia/Oceania Zone Group II for the next year, where they placed first overall and thus achieved advancement back to Group I for 2011.

References

External links 
 Fed Cup website

2009 Fed Cup Asia/Oceania Zone